Military ranks and insignia of the Army of the Republic of Bosnia and Herzegovina.

Military ranks (1992–1997)

Supreme Armed Forces Commander 
The Supreme Armed Forces Commander was held by only one person during the ARBiH's existence, Alija Izetbegović.

Generals - Generalski činovi
 Lieutenant General - General pukovnik
 Major General - General major
 Brigadier General - Brigadni general

Commissioned officers - (oficirski činovi)
 Colonel - Pukovnik
 Lieutenant colonel - Potpukovnik
 Major - Major
 Captain - Kapetan
 Senior lieutenant - Viši poručnik
 1st lieutenant - Natporučnik
 2nd lieutenant - Poručnik

Non-commissioned officers 
 Sergeant major - narednik bojnik 
 Master sergeant - Glavni narednik
 Sergeant first class - Narednik 1. klase
 Staff sergeant - stožerni narednik
 Sergeant - narednik

Enlisted ranks (vojnički činovi)
 Corporal - Kaplar
 Private first class - Vojnik 1. Klase
 Private (PV-1)  - Vojnik
 Recruit - Regrut

Military insignia (1992–1997)

Military ranks (1997–1998) 
 Supreme Commander of the Bosnian Forces - Alija Izetbegovic (until 2000)

Generals 
 Lieutenant general - General-pukovnik
 Major general - General-major
 Brigadier general - Brigadni general

Commissioned Officers 
 Colonel - Pukovnik
 Lieutenant colonel - Potpukovnik
 Major - Major
 Senior captain - Viši kapetan
 Captain - Kapetan
 1st lieutenant - Poručnik
 2nd lieutenant - Potporučnik

Non-commissioned officers 
 Command sergeant major - Narednik komande
 Sergeant major - Glavni narednik
 Master sergeant - Viši . klase
 Sergeant first class - Narednik 1. klase
 Staff sergeant - Štabni narednik
 Sergeant -  Narednik
 Corporal - Kaplar Enlisted ranks 
 Private first class - Vojnik 1. klase Private - Vojnik Recruit - Regrut''

Military insignia (1997–1998) 

Army of the Republic of Bosnia and Herzegovina

Sources